The Valley County Courthouse, on 16th St. between L and M Sts. in Ord in Valley County, Nebraska, is a Beaux Arts-style courthouse designed by architect William F. Gernandt and built in 1919.  It was listed on the National Register of Historic Places in 1990.

It is a two-story building upon a full raised basement and has a prominent, ornamented entry pavilion on its west facade.  It is decorated with elaborate cream-colored terra cotta trim which contrasts with the grey-tan brick.  It has Ionic columns.

References

External links

Courthouses on the National Register of Historic Places in Nebraska
Beaux-Arts architecture in Nebraska
Buildings and structures completed in 1919
Buildings and structures in Valley County, Nebraska
County courthouses in Nebraska